Kolka (Livonian: Kūolka) is a village in Kolka Parish, Talsi Municipality, on the tip of Cape Kolka in Courland in Latvia, on the coast of the Gulf of Riga in ancient Livonia.

Livonian homeland 
Kolka and other surrounding villages of Livonian coast are home to the last remnants of Latvia's Livonian ethnic group, whose Livonian language is highly endangered. The village has the highest number of Livonians in the historical area of Livonian coast. In 1995, of the 186 Livonians in Latvia, 53 were living in Kolka.

History 
Kolka may be the place where Danish archbishop Absalon built the first church in the Baltic region. The first mentions of it are from 1387, when it was called Domesnes, which may refer to Danish or Finnish background. The Livonian name Kūolka means "corner" in English.

Situated on the cape, the Kolka lighthouse was built in 1864 by Russian Empire navy and has been renovated twice (in 1975 and 1985). There are also ruins of the old lighthouse, which was built in the 14th century.

Climate

Religion 

Kolka has three picturesque old churches (all in service now): Lutheran, Russian Orthodox, and Roman Catholic (the three largest religious groups in Latvia). Kolka also has connection to the Tikhvin icon (Theotokos of Tikhvin), as it is Kolka's Russian Orthodox priest first saved it and his spiritual son later returned it to its original place.

Present times 
Kolka has a small hotel, a restaurant, several shops, a post office, a chemist, and a petrol station. An old fish processing factory (now closed) is located in the port harbour. There is a Livonian cultural centre with a small museum.

See also 
Livonian people

References

External links
 www.kolka.lv

Towns and villages in Latvia
Gulf of Riga
Populated coastal places in Latvia
Talsi Municipality
Courland